Susan Roshan  (born 23 September 1967) is an Iranian singer, who currently lives in California, United States. After the Iranian Revolution, she moved to the United States with her parents and brother at the age of twelve.

Discography
Taraneh Records releases
 1985: Khakestar
 1992: Doroogh Nagoo

Caltex Records releases
 1995: Bibi Eshgh
 1996: Didar (with Siavash)
 1998: Shahzadeh Eshgh
 2000: Hamkelasi

Pars Video releases
 2006: Vasvaseh

References

External links
[ Susan Roshan] at Allmusic
Susan Roshan's Homepage
Caltex Records
Taraneh Records
Pars Video
 

1967 births
Living people
Iranian women singers
Caltex Records artists
Taraneh Records artists
Persian-language singers
Iranian women pop singers
American women pop singers
American women singer-songwriters
American people of Iranian descent
21st-century American women singers
21st-century American singers
Iranian emigrants to the United States